William Sidney Stanton (September 18, 1885 – December 18, 1969) was an American character actor, whose career spanned the first twenty-five years of the sound film era. Stanton broke into the film industry at the very tail end of the silent film era in 1927, appearing in several film shorts for Hal Roach Studios. He would debut in a feature film with a small role in Raoul Walsh's 1928 silent film, Sadie Thompson, starring Gloria Swanson, Lionel Barrymore, and Walsh. During the following 20 years he would appear in another 70 films, mostly in small and supporting roles.

Notable films in which he appeared include: the 1933 version of Alice in Wonderland, whose ensemble cast included Cary Grant, W.C. Fields, Gary Cooper and Edward Everett Horton; the classic Mutiny on the Bounty (1935), starring Charles Laughton and Clark Gable; the 1936 film adaptation of James Fenimore Cooper's classic, Last of the Mohicans, directed by George B. Seitz, and starring Randolph Scott; The Prince and the Pauper (1937), starring Errol Flynn and Claude Rains; Howard Hawks' 1941 classic, Sergeant York, with Gary Cooper; and The Ghost and Mrs. Muir (1947), directed by Joseph L. Mankiewicz, and starring Gene Tierney, Rex Harrison, and George Sanders. His final big screen appearance would be as a cab driver in the Spencer Tracy and Katharine Hepburn romantic comedy, Adam's Rib, directed by George Cukor. Stanton would make one last acting performance, appearing on an episode of television's Schlitz Playhouse in 1954. Stanton died on December 18, 1969, in Los Angeles, California, and was buried in Forest Lawn Memorial Park in Glendale.

Filmography

Per AFI database

 With Love and Hisses (1927 short) as Sleeping Soldier (uncredited)
 Sailors, Beware! (1927 short) as Baron Behr (uncredited)
 Sadie Thompson (1928) as Quartermaster Bates
 The Return of Dr. Fu Manchu (1930) as Curious Passerby at Fu's Funeral (uncredited)
 Paradise Island (1930) as Limey
 Two Gun Man (1931) as Kettle-Belly (uncredited)
 Pardon Us (1931) as Insurgent Convict (uncredited)
 I Surrender Dear (1931 short) as George Dobbs (uncredited)
 Any Old Port! (1932 short) as Drunk
 Roar of the Dragon (1932) as Sailor Sam
 Me and My Gal (1932) as Drunk (uncredited)
 Cavalcade (1933) as Tommy Jolly - in the Show (uncredited)
 Sailor's Luck (1933) as J. Felix Hemingway
 Hello, Sister! (1933) as Drunk
 Alice in Wonderland (1933) as Seven of Spades (uncredited)
 Pursued (1934) as Ticket Agent (uncredited)
 The Man Who Reclaimed His Head (1934) as Drunk Soldier (uncredited)
 Baby Face Harrington (1935) as Drunken Prisoner (uncredited)
 Escapade (1935) as Singer (uncredited)
 The Irish in Us (1935) as Drunk at Fight (uncredited)
 Atlantic Adventure (1935) as Steward (uncredited)
 Bad Boy (1935) as Racker in Pool Hall (uncredited)
 The Man Who Broke the Bank at Monte Carlo (1935) as Drunken Waiter (uncredited)
 Annie Oakley (1935) as Drunk (uncredited)
 Mutiny on the Bounty (1935) as Portsmouth Joe (uncredited)
 Fury (1936) as Drunk Leaving Bar (uncredited)
 The Blackmailer (1936) as Nick (uncredited)
 The Last of the Mohicans  (1936) as Jenkins
 The Gentleman from Louisiana (1936)
 White Hunter (1936) as Harry
 Lloyd's of London (1936) as Smutt
 The Prince and the Pauper  (1937) as Man in Crowd (uncredited)
 Affairs of Cappy Ricks (1937) as Steward (uncredited)
 Another Dawn (1937) as John's Caddy (uncredited)
 Big City (1937) as Comet Cab Driver (uncredited)
 International Crime (1938) as Lush
 Four Men and a Prayer (1938) as Cockney in Marlanda 	
 Straight Place and Show (1938) as Truck Driver - Syd Robins
 Devil's Island (1939) as Bobo
 The Little Princess (1939) as Groom
 Captain Fury (1939) as Bertie Green
 Fast and Furious (1939) as Waiter (uncredited)
 We Are Not Alone (1939) as Mr. Deane (uncredited)
 The Devil and Miss Jones (1941) as Pickpocket at Precinct House (uncredited)
 Broadway Limited (1941) as Cafe Customer (uncredited)
 Sergeant York (1941) as Cockney Soldier (uncredited)
 Charley's Aunt (1941) as Messenger
 International Squadron (1941) as Minor Role (uncredited)
 Reap the Wild Wind (1942) as Rat-Faced Man (uncredited)
 This Above All (1942) as Bartender (uncredited)
 It Ain't Hay (1943) as Drunk (uncredited)
 Thumbs Up (1943) as Workman (uncredited)
 The Man from Down Under (1943) as Bettor (uncredited)
 Thank Your Lucky Stars  (1943) as Pub Character in Errol Flynn Number (uncredited)
 The Lodger (1944) as Newsboy (uncredited)
 Shine on Harvest Moon  (1944) as Drunk (uncredited)
 Mr. Skeffington (1944) as Sid Lapham (uncredited)
 The Canterville Ghost (1944) as Stonemason (uncredited)
 Our Hearts Were Young and Gay (1944) as Cockney Cabin Steward (uncredited)
 Lost in a Harem (1944) as Plain Native in Café (uncredited)
 A Guy, a Gal and a Pal (1945) as Barclay
 Son of Lassie (1945) as Dog Trainer (uncredited)
 Nob Hill (1945) as Tourist at Wax Museum (uncredited)
 Confidential Agent (1945) as Miner (uncredited) 	
 To Each His Own (1946) as Funny Little Waiter (uncredited)
 Renegades (1946) as Barfly (uncredited)
 Wife Wanted (1946) as Squint (uncredited)
 The Ghost and Mrs. Muir (1947) as Porter (uncredited)
 The Exile (1947) as Tucket
 Forever Amber (1947) as Dead Eye (uncredited)
 Slightly French (1949) as Cockney Barker (uncredited)
 Adam's Rib (1949) as Taxicab Driver (uncredited)

References

External links
 
 

20th-century American male actors
American male film actors
American male silent film actors
1885 births
1969 deaths
Burials at Forest Lawn Memorial Park (Glendale)
Male actors from London
British emigrants to the United States